In mathematics, a Carnot group is a simply connected nilpotent Lie group, together with a derivation of its Lie algebra such that the subspace with eigenvalue 1 generates the Lie algebra. The subbundle of the tangent bundle associated to this eigenspace is called horizontal. On a Carnot group, any norm on the horizontal subbundle gives rise to a Carnot–Carathéodory metric. Carnot–Carathéodory metrics have metric dilations; they are asymptotic cones (see Ultralimit) of finitely-generated nilpotent groups, and of nilpotent Lie groups, as well as tangent cones of sub-Riemannian manifolds.

Formal definition and basic properties

A Carnot (or stratified) group of step  is a connected, simply connected, finite-dimensional Lie group whose Lie algebra  admits a step- stratification. Namely, there exist nontrivial linear subspaces  such that 

Note that this definition implies the first stratum  generates the whole Lie algebra .

The exponential map is a diffeomorphism from  onto .

Sometimes it is more convenient to write an element  as

The reason is that  has an intrinsic dilation operation  given by

.

Examples

The real Heisenberg group is a Carnot group which can be viewed as a flat model in Sub-Riemannian geometry as Euclidean space in Riemannian geometry. The Engel group is also a Carnot group.

History 
However, the concept was introduced earlier by Gerald Folland (1975), under the name stratified group.

See also
Pansu derivative, a derivative on a Carnot group introduced by

References

Lie groups